Shalev may refer to:

People

Given name

Shalev Menashe (born 1982), Israeli footballer

Surname 
Aner Shalev (born 1958), Israeli mathematics professor
Avner Shalev (born 1939), Israeli chairman of the Yad Vashem Directorate
Chemi Shalev (born 1953), Israeli journalist and political analyst 
Gabriela Shalev (born 1941), Israeli jurist and Israeli ambassador to the United Nations
Meir Shalev (born 1948), Israeli writer
Sarah Marom-Shalev (born 1934), Israeli politician 
Varda Shalev (born 1959), Israeli academic and physician 
Zeruya Shalev (born 1959), Israeli author

Hebrew-language surnames
Hebrew-language given names